George Binns (6 December 1815–5 April 1847) was a New Zealand chartist leader and poet. He was born in Sunderland, England on 6 December 1815.

References

Radical Politicians and Poets in Early Victorian Britain (1993) by Stephen Roberts
http://www.thepeoplescharter.co.uk

1815 births
1847 deaths
English emigrants to New Zealand
New Zealand poets
New Zealand male poets
19th-century New Zealand poets
Chartists
19th-century poets